XEQI-AM is a radio station on 1510 AM in Monterrey, Nuevo León, Mexico. It is owned by the state government of Nuevo León and known as Radio Nuevo León.

1510 AM is a United States clear-channel frequency.

History

XEQI opened in 1979, a year after XHQI-FM Radio Gobierno signed on. It became Opus after the format was moved from 102.1 FM on July 31, 2017, replacing "La Radio Alternativa".

XEQI is nominally a daytimer but transmits from 6am to midnight.

References

1979 establishments in Mexico
Public radio in Mexico
Radio stations established in 1979
Radio stations in Monterrey
Spanish-language radio stations